Kampnagel is a theatre in Hamburg, Germany. It is Germany's biggest independent production venue for the performing arts. It is based on the premises of a former mechanical engineering factory in Winterhude, founded in 1865.

History 
Since 1982 Kampnagel has been hosting and producing cultural activities, theatre and dance performances and concerts. The site also hosts a number of festivals such as the "Internationales Sommerfestival" (International Summer Festival).

In 2022, Federal Commissioner for Culture and the Media Claudia Roth and Hamburg's State Minister for Cultural Affairs Carsten Brosda announced that Jean-Philippe Vassal and Anne Lacaton of Paris-based architectural firm Lacaton & Vassal would be awarded the contract for the renovation and expansion of Kampnagel.

Reference

External links 
 
 
 

Theatres in Hamburg
Arts centres in Germany
Music venues in Germany
Buildings and structures in Hamburg-Nord
Tourist attractions in Hamburg
Theatres completed in 1982
1982 establishments in West Germany